Coursepacks are printed collections of readings assembled by teachers to supplement college and university courses.

The practice of assembling coursepacks for students developed as a systematization of the practice of disseminating "handouts" for readings in class.  This practice operated in parallel to the practice of libraries providing "reserves"—material pulled off shelves and "reserved" for use at the library, to ensure access for students in a class.  Some teachers used coursepacks to supplement textbooks; others used them basically to create their own ad hoc textbooks.

Over time, teachers began assembling their handouts at the beginning of the course, or having school administrators assemble them and charge students enough fees to recoup costs.  As copy shops such as Kinko's became a thriving business in the late 1970s and early 1980s, they developed a market for making these coursepacks, offering different sorts of bindings, and so forth.  Once the market became commercialized, licensing entities such as CCC (the "Copyright Clearance Center") in the United States became involved, negotiating licensing and "clearance" fees for use of materials in coursepacks.  Materials that could not be licensed could not be included in coursepacks.  Primarily as a result of escalating license fees, coursepacks have become a significant expense for students, along with textbooks.

Coursepacks themselves operated primarily as an efficient service for providing print copies of material.  As information has become increasingly available electronically, academic libraries have begun a transition to electronic reserves, making materials they have already acquired available for students registered in particular classes.  Publishers, once critics of coursepack providers, have been critical of ereserves, arguing that libraries' provision of ereserves will supplant the commercial coursepack services.

Legal status 
In the United States, the question of classroom handouts received significant attention in the lobbying and negotiation leading up to the 1976 Copyright Act.  The statute as passed included a legislative codification of fair use at 17 U.S.C. 107 which specifically described handouts ("multiple copies for classroom use") as a fair use.  [T]he fair use of a copyrighted work, including such use by reproduction in copies ... for purposes such as ... teaching (including multiple copies for classroom use) ... is not an infringement of copyright."  However, the transition from classroom handouts to coursepacks led to a shift in how these materials were treated under US copyright law.  In a series of "coursepack cases", US courts found that commercial services that profited from developing coursepacks were not protected by fair use.  See Princeton University Press v. Michigan Document Services (1996), Basic Books v. Kinko's Graphics (1991); 1982 litigation against New York University.

Publishers and rights clearance agencies have sued universities in several other countries (Canada, New Zealand, India), in order to require fees for coursepacks or library ereserves.

Notes

See also
 Textbooks

Scholarly communication
Educational materials
Textbooks